Tracy Elliot Hazen (July 4, 1874 – March 16, 1943) was an American botanist and author specializing in the study of fresh water algae.

Works

References

1874 births
1943 deaths
19th-century American botanists
20th-century American botanists